Francis Boyle (born 1950) is an American professor of international law at the University of Illinois.

Francis Boyle may also refer to:
 Francis Boyle, 1st Viscount Shannon (1623–1699), Privy Counsellor of Ireland
 Francis J. Boyle (1927–2006), U.S. federal judge
 Frank Boyle (born 1945), Democratic Party member of the Wisconsin State Assembly
 Frankie Boyle (born 1972), Scottish comedian